For the Wikipedia Articles for deletion page, see WP:AFD

AFD or AfD may refer to:

Organizations
 Alexandria Fire Department, in Alexandria, Virginia
 Austin Fire Department, in Austin, Texas
 French Development Agency, French agency for international development

Politics
 Alliance for Freedom and Democracy, political party in Ethiopia
 Alliance of Democratic Forces, political alliance in Ivory Coast
 Alternative for Germany (AfD), political party in Germany
 Alliance for Germany (AFD), a centre-right coalition formed for the East German general election, 1990

Technology
 Active Format Description, set of codes for television or set-top-box decoders
 Advanced Format Drive, computer storage device
 Adjustable-frequency drive, to control AC motor speed
 AF-D, model designation for Nikon F-mount camera lenses

Transport and military
 Admiralty Floating Dock, British Navy floating drydock
 Auxiliary floating drydock of the US Navy
 Airport/Facility Directory (A/FD), US Federal Aviation Administration
 Port Alfred Airport in South Africa, IATA code

Other uses
 Adult Film Database
 Andai language ("AFD" in ISO code), of Papua New Guinea
 Australian Faunal Directory
 April Fools' Day, annual custom
 Articles for deletion, a process used on Wikipedia